Holy Family Hospital founded in 1942, is a private hospital in India. It is located in Bandra, Mumbai on Hill Road. The hospital has 268 beds, and is administered by The Bandra Holy Family Hospital Society, a non-proft charitable trust.  

Holy Family Hospital is Mumbai's first hospital with a hybrid cath lab and in October 2010, one of the three centres in India with such facilities.

History

The hospital was established by Dr Austin Da Silva as Silverene, a private 10-bed nursing home. In 1953, it was expanded into a small general hospital with 22 beds and given its current name. The administration handed over to the Medical Mission Sisters. The Congregation of the Ursuline Sisters of Mary Immaculate took charge in 1978 and began raising funds for expanding the infrastructure. By 1985, the hospital had 120 beds.

References 

Hospitals in Mumbai
Bandra
Hospitals established in 1942
1942 establishments in India